Jerry Charles Benjamin (November 9, 1909 – November 23, 1974) was an American Negro league baseball center fielder who played from 1931 to 1948. He played for the Knoxville Giants, Memphis Red Sox, Indianapolis ABCs/Detroit Stars, Birmingham Black Barons, Homestead Grays, Newark Eagles, and New York Cubans. Benjamin was part of the famous Grays that won nine pennants in eleven years, for which Benjamin was part of eight Negro National League pennant teams along with two Negro World Series championships in four Series appearances. In those contests, he batted .220 with five total runs batted in (RBI) while stealing five bases in eighteen hits. A three-time East-West All-Star, he had a .372 batting average in 1943. He led the league in a variety of categories over his sixteen season career. He led the league in triples twice (1936, 1937). In 1937, he led the league in walks (thirty), stolen bases (thirteen), games (52). He led the league in stolen bases (thirteen) in 1930. He led the league in at-bats four times (1937, 1942-44). In center field, he led the league six times in games played, twice in putouts, three times in assists, and two times each in errors committed and double plays.

Benjamin was born in Montgomery, Alabama, and died in Detroit, Michigan.

References

External links
 and Baseball-Reference Black Baseball stats and Seamheads 

1909 births
1974 deaths
Memphis Red Sox players
Indianapolis ABCs (1931–1933) players
Birmingham Black Barons players
Homestead Grays players
Newark Eagles players
New York Cubans players
Baseball players from Montgomery, Alabama
Baseball outfielders
Baseball players from Detroit
20th-century African-American sportspeople